The Comunidade Intermunicipal do Alentejo Central (English: Central Alentejo) is an administrative division in Portugal. It was created in 2009. The seat of the intermunicipal community is Évora, the main city. Other cities are Estremoz, Montemor-o-Novo, Vendas Novas and Reguengos de Monsaraz. Alentejo Central is coterminous with the former Évora District. The population in 2011 was 166,726, in an area of 7,393.46 km2.

Alentejo Central is also a NUTS3 subregion of Alentejo Region, in Portugal. Since January 2015, the NUTS 3 subregion covers the same area as the intermunicipal community.

Municipalities
The CIM Alentejo Central is composed of 14 municipalities:

References

External links

Official website CIM Alentejo Central

Alentejo
Intermunicipal communities of Portugal